Siah Peleh-ye Sofla (also Romanized as Sīāh Peleh-ye Soflá) is a village in Mansuri Rural District, Homeyl District, Eslamabad-e Gharb County, Kermanshah Province, Iran. At the 2006 census, its population was 43, in 12 families.

References 

Populated places in Eslamabad-e Gharb County